In the second half of the twentieth century, a number of Punjabis migrated to the United Kingdom from India, Pakistan and other countries. Among them a number of writers have emerged, writing variously in English and in Punjabi. Amongst these writers are Amarjit Chandan, Harjeet Atwal, Veena Verma Shivcharan Gill, Sathi Ludhianvi, K.C. Mohan, S.S. Santokh and Yash. In addition to these immigrants, British-born writers are emerging. These include Dominic Rai, Rupinderpal Singh Dhillon and Daljit Nagra.

Shivcharan Jaggi Kussa
Shivcharan Jaggi Kussa was born in the village of Kussa, in Moga district. He migrated to Austria in 1983 where he served with the German and Austrian border Police. Since 2006, he has been living in the east end of London and has produced a series of 38 Punjabi novels. He writes realistic satirical novels about corruption in the Indian Police force and Punjabi society in general. Since 2012, he has also written for Bollywood Punjabi and Hindi films. He has won many awards, including 7 gold medals and a further 17 literary awards, including the Nanak Singh Novelist Award from Punjabi Satth Lambra, Balwant Gargi award at Prof. Mohan Singh mela.
Novels: Purja Purja Cutt Marye, Tavi Ton Talwaar Takk, Bareen kohi Balda deeva, Tarkash Tangiya Jandd, Gorkh Da Tilla, Jatt Vaddhiya Bohrh Di Chhaven, Ujjad Gaye Graa'n, Baajh Bhraavo Mariya, Haaji Lok Makke Vall Jande, Etti Maar Payee Kurlaane, Sajjri Paid Da Retta, Rooh Lai Giya Dila'n Da jaani, Daachi Vaaliya Mod Muhaar Ve, Jo gi Uttar Pahaadon Aaye, Chaare Kootan Sunniya, Laggi Vaale Kde na Saunde, Boddi Vaala Taara Chadhiya, Dila'n Di Jaah, Tobhe Fook, Kulli Yaar Di Surg Da Jhoota, Dard Kehn Darvesh, Kossi Dhupp Da Nigh...

Amarjit Chandan

Amarjit Chandan was born in Nairobi in November 1946. He worked for various Punjabi literary and political magazines, including the Bombay-based Economic and Political Weekly before migrating to England in 1980, where he lives with his radio-broadcaster wife and two sons. He has published eight collections of poetry and two books of essays in Punjabi in the Gurmukhi script and two in the Persian script and one in English translation titled Being Here. His works include Jarhan, Beejak, Chhanna and Guthali. He has edited many anthologies of world poetry and fiction, including two collections of British Punjabi poetry and short stories. His poetry has been published in Greek, Turkish, Hungarian and Romanian and Indian languages. His profile and work is listed on the Danka - Pakistan's Cultural Guide.

Rupinderpal Singh Dhillon
Rupinderpal Singh Dhillon is from West London and writes novels, short stories and poetry in a British form of Punjabi which he taught himself to write. He has also published poetry in English. His debut novel, Neela Noor, was published in 2007. He writes in the locally spoken form of the language influenced by English; His work is mainly influenced by Western literature and confronts social issues including racism, gender bias and incest. Bharind (The Hornet) is a collection of short stories and poetry. In his later novels such as the experimental gothic novel O, he employs a genre he calls Vachitarvaad, which encompasses science fiction, fantasy, horror and magical realism.

Harjeet Atwal
Harjeet Atwal is a Punjabi writer mainly known as a novelist and story-teller.  Some of his novels are; One Way, Ret, Sawari, Southall, British Born Desi, Das Saal Das Yug, Early Birds, Geet. He has written seven short stories books, one poetry collection, one travelogue, one biography and many more articles for different news papers and magazines. He is editor of a literary magazine as well named Shabad. Since 1977 he has lived in London. He was born on 8 September 1952 and is married with three children.

See also
 Urdu in the United Kingdom
 British Punjabis

References

Punjab
Punjabi culture
Punjabi-language poets
Pakistani diaspora in the United Kingdom
Languages of the Pakistani diaspora
Languages of the United Kingdom